Mishari bin Abdulaziz Al Saud (1932 – 23 May 2000) was a Saudi Arabian businessman and convicted murderer. He was a member of the House of Saud.

Early life and activities
Prince Mishari was born in 1932. He was a son of King Abdulaziz and Bushra who was one of the concubines of King Abdulaziz. 

Prince Mishari was a businessman and a poet. He owned a company, Al Saada Trading and Contracting, in Jeddah.

Personal life
One of his spouses was a Syrian-origin woman from Aleppo who was the mother of Princess Maha. 

His son, Prince Mohammed bin Mishari, is a member of the Allegiance Council. His daughter, Maha bint Mishari, is an academic at Alfaisal University’s College of Medicine and a physician at King Faisal Specialist Hospital and Research Centre. 

Prince Mishari died in the United States at age 68 on 23 May 2000. He was buried at Al Adl cemetery in Mecca.

The murder of British diplomat
Cyril Ousman was a British citizen who had been in Arabia since 1929 and worked as an engineer. Later he became the British vice-consul in Jeddah. He held a party on 16 November 1951 where Prince Mishari, aged nineteen, was among the guests. Ousman refused to pour Mishari another drink, since he had already reached his maximum limit. Mishari left, and came back shortly carrying a gun and fired into the Ousman's home. His wife, Dorothy Ousman, was shielded by her husband, and Ousman was shot dead by Prince Mishari.

Ousman was buried next day in Jeddah's non-Muslim cemetery. In 1952, King Abdulaziz imposed a total ban on alcohol in his kingdom. Ousman's wife left Jeddah quietly, accepting King Abdulaziz's compensation. Mishari was sentenced to life imprisonment. He was spared the death penalty due to his royal status. Mishari was released during the reign of King Saud.

Raymond A. Hare, then US Ambassador to Saudi Arabia, argued in a letter to US Foreign Service dated 25 November 1951 that the murder was very similar to a scene in an American movie that Prince Mishari, Cyril Ousman and his wife had watched together only a few days before the incident.

Ancestry

References

Mishari
Mishari
1932 births
2000 deaths
Mishari
Mishari
Mishari
Mishari
Mishari
Mishari